The 1987 Clásica de San Sebastián was the 7th edition of the Clásica de San Sebastián cycle race and was held on 12 August 1987. The race started and finished in San Sebastián. The race was won by Marino Lejarreta of the Caja Rural team.

General classification

References

Clásica de San Sebastián
San